Rmeil is one of the neighborhoods  of Beirut, the capital of Lebanon. It is located near Ashrafieh,  and Saifi. The neighborhood is known for its Greek Orthodox churches such as Saint Georges and Saint Nicolas. Cultural areas are located in Rmeil, like the Sursock Museum. 

The neighborhood is also home to important hospitals, from the Saint George Hospital University Medical to the Geitawi Hospital.

References

Neighbourhoods of Beirut